Hans Heyer (born 16 March 1943) is a German racing driver who mainly raced touring cars, being popular with the fans for his rather funny style. He is better known for actions and antics during his only start in Formula One at the 1977 German Grand Prix.

Very unusual for his Western German origin, Heyer's sign is his so-called Tirolerhut, a hat from Tyrol or Bavaria which would fit better to drivers from these Alpine regions, like Hans-Joachim Stuck or Niki Lauda.

Early life
Heyer was born in Mönchengladbach, Germany to parents who ran a bitumen and a concrete mixing company. Heyer developed his passion for motor racing and engineering when he was at boarding school at Adenau, which is near the Nürburgring. He later started an apprenticeship with Daimler-Benz as a mechanic which was completed in 1962.

Racing career

1960s
Living close to the Netherlands and not yet allowed to race in Germany at the age of 16, he started his career there in 1959 with karts and won the 1962 Dutch Championship in the 100cc category which he followed up by winning the 125cc class in 1963. In an attempt to race in his native Germany, he initially encountered problems with his racing license but managed to compete in the Formula K class in 1965 finishing 3rd in the next two years and backed up with the German and European Formula K titles in 1968 to 1971 driving in a Taifun/BM. Heyer also raced in France by competing in the Brignoles 24 Hour Classic in 1969 to 1971 winning twice and finished 2nd in 1970.

1970s

For many years, Heyer was associated with Zakspeed, racing their Group 2 Ford Escorts in the European Touring Car Championship (champion 1974) and the Deutsche Rennsport Meisterschaft (champion 1975 and 1976). Heyer attempted two European F2 races in 1976, finishing sixth at the first Hockenheim race. He failed to qualify for the second Hockenheim race and made no further attempts in F2.

In his single attempt at Formula One, he entered the 1977 German Grand Prix on 31 July 1977 with the second Penske car of the new German team ATS. With little experience in single seaters and a bad car, he did not qualify. He was the third reserve driver, meaning that he would get the chance to race if three drivers dropped out. But since Frank Williams chose not to prepare his driver Patrick Nève, who was the first reserve, for the race, and since de Villota, who was the second reserve, had a last-moment engine failure before the race, Heyer had effectively became the first reserve driver. Because of the crash and commotion on the starting grid at the start of the race, Heyer chose to start the race anyway, slipping out of the pits and joining the pack. Only when his gearbox failed after 9 laps was it realised that Heyer should not have been competing, whereupon he was disqualified. He never attempted another race in Formula One. He is the only driver to be credited with a DNQ (did not qualify), DNF (did not finish), and DSQ (disqualified) in the same race, technically being banned from 5 Formula One races afterwards (which effectively became a lifetime ban because he had no intention to compete any further in Formula One).

1980s
In 1980 he won the DRM again, this time for Lancia in a Group 5 Lancia Monte Carlo Turbo, a car he also helped develop. He crashed his 480 hp car badly at the Norisring in Nuremberg, rolling several times. Heyer switched to continuations cooling when control of the water supply failed when the brake light switch failed which had not worked resulting in the left front brake caliper failing which destroyed the tyre rod and a burst affected the front left tyre. He escaped unhurt, but returned immediately to the wreck to recover his famous hat. In the following medical exam, the doctor was said to have been more nervous than Hans was.

Heyer won the 12 Hours of Sebring race in 1984 driving alongside Stefan Johansson and Mauricio de Narvaez in a Porsche 935.

During the years that the Spa 24 Hours was run as part of the European Touring Car Championship and the inaugural World Touring Car Championship (1982–1988), Heyer won the race three times in succession. He won in 1982 driving a BMW 528i with Armin Hahne and Eddy Joosen, 1983 in a BMW 635 CSi with Hahne and Thierry Tassin, and finally in 1984 driving a TWR Jaguar XJS with Tom Walkinshaw and Win Percy.
Heyer retired in 1989 after 999 races in 30 years.

1990s
Between 1990 and 1991 Heyer worked at his family concrete works business but came out of retirement to test Mercedes-Benz's truck racing vehicles and competed in the Nürburgring Truck Grand Prix in 1992. Heyer returned to the same track in 1994 to compete in the Nürburgring 24 Hours alongside Heiner Weiss, Rainer Braun driving a BMW M3 and returned to compete in the same race in 1995 albeit in a BMW veterans 'Dream Team'. Heyer also competed in the Nürburgring 500 km race in 1997.

2000s
In 2004, Volkswagen director Kris Nissen found out about the number and invited Hans Heyer to drive his 1000th race in the ADAC Volkswagen Polo Cup at the Norisring against youngsters.

Personal life
His son Kenneth Heyer is also a racing driver, currently involved in the Blancpain GT Series Endurance Cup driving a Mercedes-AMG GT3 for MANN-FILTER HTP Motorsport.

Racing record

Complete 24 Hours of Le Mans results

Complete European Formula Two Championship results
(key) (Races in bold indicate pole position; races in italics indicate fastest lap)

Complete Formula One results
(key)

 Started illegally after failing to qualify and did not finish.

References

External links

 Hans Heyer Website
 Website with Results
 Profile on F1 Rejects
 Complete racing results

1943 births
Living people
People from Wegberg
Sportspeople from Cologne (region)
Racing drivers from North Rhine-Westphalia
German racing drivers
German Formula One drivers
ATS Wheels Formula One drivers
European Formula Two Championship drivers
24 Hours of Le Mans drivers
World Sportscar Championship drivers
24 Hours of Spa drivers
European Touring Car Championship drivers
12 Hours of Sebring drivers
Mercedes-AMG Motorsport drivers
Schnitzer Motorsport drivers
Jaguar Racing drivers
Racing Bart Mampaey drivers
Team Joest drivers